Soldiers in Hiding is a 1985 American documentary film directed by Malcolm Clarke. It was part of HBO's America Undercover series. It was nominated for an Academy Award for Best Documentary Feature.

References

External links

1985 films
1985 documentary films
American documentary films
Documentary films about veterans
Documentary films about the Vietnam War
1980s English-language films
1980s American films